Safflorite is a rare cobalt iron arsenide mineral with the chemical formula . Safflorite is a member of the three-way substitution series of arsenides known as the loellingite or loellingite group. More than fifty percent iron makes the mineral loellingite whereas more than fifty percent nickel and the mineral is rammelsbergite. A parallel series of antimonide minerals exist. 

Safflorite along with the other minerals crystallize in the orthorhombic system forming opaque gray to white massive to radiating forms, Clinosafflorite has a monoclinic symmetry. It has a mohs hardness of 4.5 and a specific gravity of 6.9 to 7.3. Twinning is common and star shaped twins are frequently found. 

It was first described in 1835 from the Schneeberg District, Erzgebirge, Saxony, Germany. Safflorite occurs with other arsenide minerals as an accessory in silver mining districts. It alters to the arsenate erythrite in the secondary environment.

References

Minerals.net
Mineral galleries
 

Cobalt minerals
Iron minerals
Arsenide minerals
Orthorhombic minerals
Minerals in space group 58